Raigarh Lok Sabha constituency is one of the eleven Lok Sabha (parliamentary) constituencies in Chhattisgarh state in central India.

Assembly segments
Raigarh Lok Sabha constituency is reserved for Scheduled Tribes (ST) candidates. It is composed of the following assembly segments:

Members of Parliament

Election results

General election 2019

General election 2014

General election 2009

See also
 Raigarh district
 Rajgarh district is in Madhya Pradesh. Some people get confused since its name sounds similar to 'Raigarh'. 
 List of Constituencies of the Lok Sabha

References

Lok Sabha constituencies in Chhattisgarh
Jashpur district
Raigarh district